Abdelhakim Bagy (born 31 March 1968 in Hichaoua, Morocco) is a retired male long-distance runner from France who mainly competed in the marathon race during his career. He set his personal best (2:11:06) in the classic distance on 8 April 2001 at the Paris Marathon.

Achievements

External links

1968 births
Living people
French male long-distance runners
French sportspeople of Moroccan descent